One Park Tower, alternately referenced as 34 Peachtree Street is a  class-B office building skyscraper in Atlanta, Georgia. It was completed in 1961 and has 32 floors. It is the 24th tallest building in Atlanta, and was the tallest until it was passed by 2 Peachtree Street in 1966.

See also
List of tallest buildings in Atlanta

References

Skyscraper office buildings in Atlanta
Office buildings completed in 1961